Saïss Airport or Fès–Saïss Airport  is an airport serving Fez, the capital city of the Fès-Meknès region in Morocco. The airport crossed the million passengers mark in 2017 for the first time of its history by totalising 1,115,595 travelers.

Facilities

Airlines and destinations
The following airlines operate regular scheduled and charter flights at Fès–Saïs Airport:

 On selected days, this flight operates from Tangier to Paris via Fez. However, this carrier does not have rights to transport passengers solely between Fez and Tangier.

Statistics

Ground transport
The airport Fez Saiss is located about 13 km from the city center of Fez. The bus (number 16) offers regular trips between the airport and the bus and train stations of Fez. The trip takes 40 mins from the airport to the central train station. Taxis are available for hire at the exit of the passenger terminal. The rate to the city centre is fixed at 150 dirhams.

References

External links
 
 

Airports in Morocco
Buildings and structures in Fès-Meknès
Fez, Morocco